The Central Council of Church Bell Ringers (CCCBR) is an organisation founded in 1891 which represents ringers of church bells in the English style.

It acts as a co-ordinating body for education, publicity and codifying change ringing rules, also for advice on maintaining and restoring full-circle bells. Within England, where the vast majority of English-style rings are located, most towers are affiliated through local ringing associations.

The Central Council also publishes the bell ringers' weekly journal The Ringing World.

Origins
Change ringing had developed rapidly in the nineteenth century helped by the formation of the many local ringing associations which had sprung up. However, the need to have a national body with general oversight was increasingly debated, and discussions took place in 1883 about forming one. The eminent ringer, the Revd F.E. Robinson, advocated a National Association to connect the many ringing associations and collect and publish ringing information and performances, but this did not gather much support.

However, the bell ringing aristocrat Sir Arthur P. Heywood still saw the need for standardisation of phraseology and change ringing methods and rules, in addition to representing the interests of ringers as a whole. He saw an alternative solution, which was to have a central "advisory" body.

Heywood contrived in 1890 to organise a dinner in Birmingham for the 80th birthday of the noted ringer Henry Johnson, to which representatives of ringing associations from around the country were invited to attend as a "national gathering". At the dinner he proposed a meeting of representatives from each association to discuss "matters of consequence".

Heywood's ideas of the aims of the prospective Council were:
To promote the "Exercise" (as change ringing was referred to then) 
Maintain ringing as organised church work
Developing the Art (of change ringing)
To arbitrate on ringing rules

At the exploratory gathering in 1890 there was strong support for the concept of a central advisory and coordinating body, and the first formal meeting of the new Council took place the following year on Easter Tuesday, 28 March 1891, at the Inns of Court Hotel, London. 74 representatives were present from 33 different societies, and Sir Arthur was elected as the  Council's first President.

Two Initial Committees were appointed; one to liaise with the Church Congress and a second for bells & fittings. The first meeting debated the definition of peals which was a strong current topic, and which has been debated at intervals ever since. Further debate took place in 1892 with general agreement on rules for ringing on 8, 10 and 12 bells but there was divided opinion on ringing on 5 & 6 bells. Such was the dissent that the subject of peal "Decisions" was dropped in 1897 and not raised again until 1911.

Functions
The Council meets annually in September where major policy decisions are discussed and the reports of the many committees are received. However, much of the Council's work is done in committee.

Biographies
In 1903 the Church Press Committee was formed to compile biographies of ringers, this was a forerunner of the present-day Biographies Committee. Over the period 1899–1900 a survey was made of the condition of bells across the country. One aspect of interest in towers were experiments in tower movement measurement, another aspect of work which today rests with the Towers & Belfries Committee.

Railway travel
Amongst the seemingly more unusual committees formed was that seeking concessionary fares upon the railways which were the only form of long distance transport to get to meetings, peals and other ringing events. Concessions were sometimes granted and bell ringers were included along with theatre companies and other groups qualifying for reductions right up until the early 1960s.

The rolls of honour
At the London meeting in 1921 the names of over 1,000 ringers who had perished in the War was read out. The Council instituted the first volume of Rolls of Honour which has been followed on to this day with much modern research.

Broadcasting
It was the start of radio broadcasts in 1925 which prompted interest in seeing that properly considered broadcasts of ringing came across. This was followed by television and now social media all of which are part and parcel of the Public Relations Committee work. This does of course extend to public awareness and campaigns to ringing for special occasions particularly those with national importance like HM Queen's 90th birthday.

Library and publications 
The Central Council Library is an important collection of books on bell ringing and campanology.

In 1916 Sir A.P. Heywood died, and left his ringing books to the Cambridge University Guild which decided to donate them as the basis of a library for the Central Council in 1920.

The Rev. C.W.O. Jenkyn was the first librarian. He was succeeded as librarian by the Rev. Bernard Tyrwhitt-Drake of Walsoken, then by Wilfrid J. Hooton, and in 1953, Frederick Sharpe F.S.A. well known as a writer on historical aspects of bells and ringing. In 1958 Frank Perrens of Coventry was appointed until 1968.

in 1976, when William T. Cook was elected, and with his appointment the rate of accessions increased, and at the time of his death in 1992 there were over 2,000 catalogue entries, some of which represent multiple items. Thus, for instance, a set of Guild or Association reports, perhaps over 100 in number, is represented by a single catalogue number. The present incumbent is  Dr. John C. Eisel,  although his title is now that of Steward of the Library.

Committees
Most of the committees are concerned with the normal minutiae of an organisation: administration, various records/archives.  However, there are some highly esoteric committees such as Methods, which is concerned with defining and recording methods and principles. It lays down the criteria for accepting peals, including quarter and half peals, which was a topic of the early council meetings, and still excites debate today.

The current (2016) committees are:

 Administrative
 Methods
 Peal records
 Public relations
 Publications
 Ringing Centres
 Ringing trends
 Towers and belfries
 Tower Stewardship
 Bell restoration
 Biographies
 Compositions
 Education
 Information and communications technology
 Library

The Ringing World
The Ringing World is a weekly journal devoted entirely to bell ringing and is the official journal of the Central Council for Church Bell Ringers. It is published in the UK as a paper periodical and an online edition, in 2018 it had an average weekly circulation of 2,627. It records notable ringing performances, carries features on bells, change ringing, bell towers and ringers, it is a platform for correspondence, and advertises ringing events and publishes obituaries. It is the "journal of record for performances" in ringing, and peals must be published in it.

It was first published in 1911 from Guildford as a weekly periodical to report ringing news and details of peals and quarter peals rung around the world. Its founder and first editor was John Sparkes Goldsmith, who was born at Southover, Lewes, on 13 January 1878 and died on 1 June 1942. Following his death the Central Council guaranteed the publications against losses, until in 1945 it was decided to acquire it. Subsequently, from 1983 the journal would be constituted as a self-standing charitable body but still answerable to Council members.

In 2011, celebrations of the 100 year anniversary of the magazine were held nationally, with open ringing round London churches, and a service at Westminster Abbey. Including the inaugural Ringing World National Youth Contest, a striking contest for young ringers.

In 2016 readers of the magazine wrote to insist that bell ringing was "an art and a sport", as demonstrated by regular "striking competitions." It was suggested that classification of change ringing as a sport by Sport England could save it from becoming obsolete. But the Central Council of Church Bell Ringers opposed the move, suggesting that it would jeopardise its relationship with church bodies, since bell ringing should be seen as part of Christian worship, not exercise. The council's president, Chris Mew, said: "Where is the glamour of the sports field and where are the David Beckhams of the belfry?"

Membership 
The members of the CCCBR are either representative, fellow, or ex-officio. There are representatives for 66 affiliated organisations from both territorial & non territorial  organisations throughout the world  who serve for a three-year term.  The council may elect fellows as life members for services to ringing.

As of May 2020 there are 4 fellows and 12 ex-officio members.

List of affiliated ringing societies
As of May 2020, the following 66 societies are affiliated members of the Central Council.

 Ancient Society of College Youths (4 CC Reps),
 The Australian and New Zealand Association of Bellringers (4 CC Reps),
 Barrow and District Society (1 CC Reps),
 Bath and Wells Diocesan Association (5 CC Reps),
 Bedfordshire Association (3 CC Reps),
 Beverley and District Society (2 CC Reps),
 Cambridge University Guild (2 CC Reps),
 Carlisle Diocesan Guild (2 CC Reps),
 Chester Diocesan Guild (4 CC Reps),
 Coventry Diocesan Guild (4 CC Reps),
 Derby Diocesan Association (4 CC Reps),
 Devon Association (2 CC Reps),
 Devonshire Guild (4 CC Reps),
 Dorset County Association (2 CC Reps),
 Durham and Newcastle Diocesan Association (4 CC Reps),
 Durham University Society (1 CC Reps),
 East Derbyshire & West Nottinghamshire Association (1 CC Reps),
 East Grinstead and District Guild (1 CC Reps),
 Ely Diocesan Association (4 CC Reps),
 Essex Association (5 CC Reps),
 Four Shires Guild (2 CC Reps),
 Gloucester and Bristol Diocesan Association (5 CC Reps),
 Guildford Diocesan Guild (4 CC Reps),
 Hereford Diocesan Guild (4 CC Reps),
 Hertford County Association of Change Ringers (4 CC Reps),
 Irish Association (2 CC Reps),
 Kent County Association of Change Ringers (5 CC Reps),
 Ladies' Guild (3 CC Reps),
 Lancashire Association (5 CC Reps),
 Leeds University Society (1 CC Reps),
 Leicester Diocesan Guild (4 CC Reps),
 Lichfield & Walsall Archdeaconry Society (3 CC Reps),
 Lincoln Diocesan Guild (4 CC Reps),
 Liverpool Universities Society (1 CC Reps),
 Llandaff and Monmouth Diocesan Association (3 CC Reps),
 Middlesex County Association & London Diocesan Guild (4 CC Reps)
 National Police Guild (1 CC Reps),
 North American Guild of Change Ringers (4 CC Reps),
 North Staffordshire Association (2 CC Reps),
 North Wales Association (2 CC Reps),
 Norwich Diocesan Association (4 CC Reps),
 Oxford Diocesan Guild of Church Bell Ringers (6 CC Reps),
 Oxford Society of Change Ringers (1 CC Reps),
 Oxford University Society of Change Ringers (1 CC Reps),
 Peterborough Diocesan Guild (4 CC Reps),
 Salisbury Diocesan Guild (5 CC Reps),
 Scottish Association (2 CC Reps),
 Shropshire Association (2 CC Reps),
 Society of Royal Cumberland Youths (4 CC Reps),
 Society of Sherwood Youths (1 CC Reps),
 South African Guild (1 CC Reps),
 Southwell and Nottingham Diocesan Guild (4 CC Reps),
 St Agatha's Guild (1 CC Reps),
 St David's Diocesan Guild (1 CC Reps),
 St Martin's Guild for the Diocese of Birmingham (2 CC Reps)
 Suffolk Guild of Ringers (4 CC Reps),
 Surrey Association (4 CC Reps),
 Sussex County Association (5 CC Reps),
 Swansea and Brecon Diocesan Guild (2 CC Reps),
 Truro Diocesan Guild (4 CC Reps),
 University of Bristol Society of Change Ringers (2 CC Reps),
 University of London Society of Change Ringers (1 CC Reps),
 Veronese, Associazione Suonatori di Campane a Sistema (Italy) (2 CC Reps),
 Winchester and Portsmouth Diocesan Guild (5 CC Reps),
 Worcestershire and Districts Association (4 CC Reps),
 Yorkshire Association (5 CC Reps).

Presidents
1891–1916 Sir Arthur Percival Heywood
1918–1921 Rev. Anchitel H. F. Boughey
1921–1930 Rev. Canon George F. Coleridge
1930–1957 Edwin H. Lewis
1957–1963 Frederick Sharpe
1963–1969 Rev. Canon A. Gilbert G. Thurlow
1969–1975 John Freeman
1975–1981 Edwin A. Barnett
1981–1984 Rev. John G. M. Scott
1984–1987 Philip A. Corby
1987–1990 Rev. Dr. John C. Baldwin
1990–1993 Christopher J. Groome
1993–1996 Prof. Ronald J. Johnston
1996–1999 M. Jane Wilkinson
1999–2002 John A. Anderson
2002–2005 Dr. Michael J. de C. Henshaw
2005–2008 Derek E. Sibson
2008–2011 Anthony P. Smith
2011–2014 Kate N. Flavell
2014–2017 Christopher F. Mew
2017–2019 Dr. Christopher D. O’Mahony
2019–     Simon J. L. Linford

See also 
 Dove's Guide for Church Bell Ringers

References

External links 

 Bellboard – online update on current change ringing performances
 Central Council decisions – includes the Council's definition of a peal

Bell ringing organizations
Music organisations based in the United Kingdom